Jørstad Church is a chapel of the Church of Norway in the northern part of the large Stavanger Municipality in Rogaland county, Norway. It is located in the village of Jørstadvågen on the island of Ombo. It is an annex chapel in the Sjernarøy parish which is part of the Tungenes prosti (deanery) in the Diocese of Stavanger. The white, wooden church was built in a long church style in 1929 using designs by the architect Gustav Helland. The church seats about 150 people.

See also
List of churches in Rogaland

References

Churches in Stavanger
Wooden churches in Norway
20th-century Church of Norway church buildings
Churches completed in 1929
1929 establishments in Norway